Ola Severin (born 20 November 1964) is a retired Swedish football midfielder.

References

1964 births
Living people
Swedish footballers
Trelleborgs FF players
Ystads IF players
Association football midfielders
Allsvenskan players